Nazirhat Nazirhat is a town and a municipal council in the Chittagong district in the southern part of Bangladesh. Located on the banks of the Halda river, this small town is one of the famous commercial centers of North Chittagong. In 1930, Nazirhat was connected to the Eastern Railway of India by the Assam-Bengal Railway. Regional Highway R160 (96 km long) runs from Hathazari town to Nazirhat town and Khagrachhari over Fatikchhari town.

The nearest international and domestic airports to the city are Shah Amanat International Airport and Cox's Bazar Airport respectively. The city is the second-largest urban area in Fatikchhari Upazila. The town of Nazirhat is located at a distance of only 36 km [2] from the port city Chittagong. The small town is located on the banks of the river Halda river and Dhurung.

Transport 
Trains, buses, CNG auto-rickshaws are types of vehicles to reach this place from Chittagong City.

References 

Populated places in Chittagong Division
Villages in Chittagong District
Villages in Chittagong Division